Trey Ruscoe (born 3 November 2001) is a professional Australian rules footballer who plays for the Collingwood Football Club in the Australian Football League (AFL).

AFL career
Ruscoe was selected at pick 55 in the 2019 AFL Draft by the Collingwood Football Club and made his debut in Round 10 against the Sydney Swans

Statistics
Updated to the end of the 2022 season.

|-
| 2020 ||  || 39
| 4 || 5 || 4 || 17 || 6 || 23 || 5 || 3 || 1.3 || 1.0 || 4.3 || 1.5 || 5.8 || 1.3 || 0.8
|-
| 2021 ||  || 21
| 9 || 2 || 0 || 73 || 33 || 106 || 27 || 15 || 0.2 || 0.0 || 8.1 || 3.7 || 11.8 || 3.0 || 1.7
|-
| 2022 ||  || 21
| 4 || 0 || 1 || 24 || 9 || 33 || 10 || 5 || 0.0 || 0.3 || 6.0 || 2.3 || 8.3 || 2.5 || 1.3
|- class=sortbottom
! colspan=3 | Career
! 17 !! 7 !! 5 !! 114 !! 48 !! 162 !! 42 !! 23 !! 0.4 !! 0.3 !! 6.7 !! 2.8 !! 9.5 !! 2.5 !! 1.4
|}

Notes

References

External links
 
 
 

2001 births
Living people
Australian rules footballers from Western Australia
Collingwood Football Club players
People educated at Aquinas College, Perth